Emmanuel Elukwu Ezukam (born 22 October 1984 in Nigeria), is a Nigerian football midfielder who plays for Ghazl El-Mehalla.

Ezukam played for the Al Arabi Kuwait side that reached the quarter-finals of the 2009 AFC Cup.

References

External links

1984 births
Nigerian footballers
Nigerian expatriate footballers
Zob Ahan Esfahan F.C. players
Expatriate footballers in Iran
Expatriate footballers in Armenia
Expatriate footballers in Kuwait
Expatriate footballers in Syria
Living people
Armenian Premier League players
Association football midfielders
Kazma SC players
FC Ararat Yerevan players
Taliya SC players
Al-Arabi SC (Kuwait) players
Al Salmiya SC players
Khaitan SC players
Al-Ittihad Aleppo players
Al-Shabab SC (Kuwait) players
Nigerian football managers
Syrian Premier League players
Nigerian expatriate sportspeople in Kuwait
Nigerian expatriate sportspeople in Armenia
Nigerian expatriate sportspeople in Syria
Nigerian expatriate sportspeople in Iran
Kuwait Premier League players